Natnael Berhane (born 5 January 1991 in Asmara) is an Eritrean professional road bicycle racer, who currently rides for amateur team AlShafar Jumeirah. He is a two time African cycling champion in 2012 and 2013.

Career
In 2013, Berhane joined . Berhane won the queen stage of the 2013 Tour of Turkey by powering away from the small lead group in the last 200 meters of a long, steep climb. With the provisional suspension of Mustafa Sayar for an earlier EPO positive in the Tour of Algeria, the first place on the General Classification was awarded to Berhane. In early 2014 Turkish Cycling Federation stripped off Mustafa and announced Berhane's victory. At the beginning of the season, Berhane won La Tropicale Amissa Bongo, thanks to the bonus seconds awarded during the intermediate sprints on the last stage. He was the first African winner of this race.

After two years with Europcar for his professional debut, Berhane joined African Pro-Continental cycling team  for the 2015 cycling season. He was named in the start list for the 2016 Tour de France and the start list for the 2017 Giro d'Italia.

Major results

2009
 7th Overall Tour of Eritrea
2010
 1st  Overall Tour of Eritrea
1st Stage 1
 2nd Overall Tour of Rwanda
1st Stage 7
 9th Road race, African Road Championships
2011
 African Road Championships
1st  Road race
1st  Team time trial
 1st Stage 6 La Tropicale Amissa Bongo
 3rd Overall Tour d'Algérie
1st Stage 1
 8th Circuit d'Alger
2012
 African Road Championships
1st  Road race
1st  Team time trial
7th Time trial
 1st  Overall Tour d'Algérie
1st Young rider classification
1st Stage 3
2013
 1st  Team time trial, African Road Championships
 1st  Overall Tour of Turkey
1st Stage 3
2014
 1st  Time trial, National Road Championships
 1st  Overall La Tropicale Amissa Bongo
1st  Sprints classification
 5th Tour du Finistère
2015
 African Road Championships
1st  Team time trial
6th Road race
 National Road Championships
1st  Road race
3rd Time trial
 5th Overall Tour of Austria
 7th Overall Tour of Utah
2017
 2nd Time trial, National Road Championships
2018
 10th Overall Tour of Guangxi
2019
 1st  Road race, National Road Championships
 African Games
2nd  Team time trial
4th Road race
4th Time trial
  Combativity award Stage 10 Tour de France

Grand Tour general classification results timeline

References

External links 

Team Europcar Profile

1991 births
Living people
Eritrean male cyclists
Sportspeople from Asmara
Presidential Cycling Tour of Turkey stage winners
Presidential Cycling Tour of Turkey winners
African Games silver medalists for Eritrea
African Games medalists in cycling
Competitors at the 2019 African Games